Chris Horder (born in Sydney, New South Wales in 1976) is an Australian contemporary artist.

Education

Horder completed a Bachelor of Fine Arts with honours at the National Art School in Darlinghurst in 2008 and in 2011 was awarded the Young Emerging Artist Award in the Mosman Art Prize.

His works has been displayed at Liverpool Street Gallery in Sydney.

A central theme to his works is "idea of the alchemy of the subconscious and the metaphysical aspects of paint itself, the work challenges the viewer’s interpretation of the visual world through the indulgences of chance imagery".

References

1976 births
Living people
Australian painters
National Art School alumni